The Indian locomotive class WCM-5 is a class of 1.5 kV DC electric locomotives that was developed in 1956 by Chittaranjan Locomotive Works (CLW) for Indian Railways. The model name stands for broad gauge (W), Direct Current (C), Mixed traffic (M) engine, 5th generation (5). The trains were the first locomotive of any kind fully developed and built in India. They entered service in 1961. A total of 21 WCM-5 locomotives was built at CLW between 1961 and 1963.

The WCM-5 served both passenger and freight trains for over 39 years. With the introduction of more modern types of locomotives  and 25 KV AC electrification, all were withdrawn in early 2000s after repeated failures. Today one locomotive is preserved with rest of the locomotives have been Scrapped. In 1998 the last WCM 5 locomotive done the duty with legendary Indrayani Express

History 
the history of WCM-5 begins in the early 1960s with the stated aim of the Indian Railways (IR) to remove the aging fleet of WCG-1 and WCP-1 class locomotives working in the Central Railways (CR) . So IR to procure 21 1500 V DC electric locomotives from Chittaranjan Locomotive Works (CLW), who also previously supplied Steam locomotives to India. They are manufactured in India in 1954-1955.They were the last “nosed” locomotives of any type to be manufactured.

The WCM-5 locomotives were used on many Express trains like the Deccan Queen, Indrayani Express etc as well as in Freight Duties. The Deccan Queen had WCM-5 with a matching livery until 1990s. In mid 1990s the aging WCM-5 began to fail regularly causing disruption in train services. So Central Railways decided to withdraw these locomotive from services and by 2000 ,all units were withdrawn.

Preserved Examples

Former sheds 

 Pune
 Kalyan (KYN)
  All the locomotives of this class has been withdrawn from service.

See also 

 Rail transport in India#History
 Indian Railways
 Locomotives of India
 Rail transport in India

References

External links 

 http://www.irfca.org/faq/faq-specs.html#WCM-1
 
 India railway fan club

Electric locomotives of India
1500 V DC locomotives
Co-Co locomotives
Railway locomotives introduced in 1961
5 ft 6 in gauge locomotives
Chittaranjan Locomotive Works locomotives